Brazil has great forests. Minas Gerais, Brazil's central state, larger domain is the tropical forest. Within it there are many types of plants. Separated by families this is a list of these plants:

Poaceae
Bambusoideae - Imperata brasiliensis - Melinis minutiflora - Cymbopogon citratus.

Arecaceae
Cocos nucifera - Attalea funifera - Acrocomia aculeata.

Lauraceae
Ocotea megaphylla - Cinnamomum zeylanicum - Persea americana - Persea indica.

Asteraceae
Vernonia polysphaera - Bellis annua - Pluchea sagittalis*.

Fabaceae
Anadenanthera colubrina - Erythrina verna - Mimosa pudica - Dalbergia nigra - Ingá - Hymenaea courbaril - Enterolobium timbouva - Mora - Myrocarpus frondosus - Vigna unguiculata.

Rubiaceae
Genipa americana - Calycophyllum spruceanum - Ruta graveolens - Cephaelis - Coffea arabica - Uncaria tomentosa*.

Loranthaceae
Viscum cruciatum

Lamiaceae
Rosmarinus officinalis - Ocimum basilicum.

Solanaceae
Solanum lycocarpum - Solanum nigrum - Melissa officinalis - Datura suaveolens.

Urticaceae
Cecropia.

Cucurbitaceae
Momordica.

Brassicaceae
Coronopus didymus.

Moraceae
Ficus doliaria - Ficus gomelleira - Ficus clusiifolia.

Bromeliaceae
Bromeliaceae pinguim - Ananas.

Agavaceae
Furcraea foetida

Myrtaceae
Eugenia uniflora - Psidium guajava- Psidium cattleianum - Plinia trunciflora - Campomanesia corymbosa.

Rhamnaceae
Zizyphus joazeiro.

Phytolaccaceae
Petiveria tetrandra

Bignoniaceae
Tabebuia spp - Crescentia cujete - Tabebuia - Tabebuia aurea - Jacaranda mimosaefolia.

Zingiberaceae
Amomum cardamom*

Anacardiaceae
Schinopsis brasiliensis - Mangifera.

Bixaceae
Bixa orellana.

Euphorbiaceae
Euphorbia pulcherrima -  Alchornea triplinervia - Ricinus communis - Joanesia princeps.

Rutaceae
Balfourodendron riedelianum - Pilocarpus microphyllus - Citrus × limon - Citrus reticulata - Citrus x sinensis.

Sapindaceae
Sapindus saponaria.

Apocynaceae
Plumeria.

Malvaceae
Luehea.

Meliaceae
Carapa

Annonaceae
Duguetia lanceolata - Annona coriacea.

Tropaeolaceae
Tropaeolum majus

Apiaceae
Foeniculum vulgare - Coriandrum sativum.

Salicaceae
Casearia sylvestris - Casearia gossypiosperma*.

Phyllanthaceae
Phyllanthus acutifolius.

Musaceae
Musa.

Araceae
Xanthosoma sagittifolium - Philodendron.

Rosaceae
Rosa

Caricaceae
Carica papaya

Lecythidaceae
Sapucaia

Myristicaceae
Bicuiba

Others
Polypodium lepidopteris
Portuguese common names

Catita
Gema de Ovo
Fruta da Cutia
Gonçalves
João Henrique (plant)
Limpa Viola
Jurobão
Pasto de Abelha
Gondó

See also
 
 List of plants of Atlantic Forest vegetation of Brazil
 

 
Environment of Minas Gerais
Minas Gerais